Dušan Kabát (20 August 1944 – 19 May 2022 in Prague) was a Czechoslovakian international football player.

Career
Born in Sereď, Kabát began playing football with TJ Leopoldov. In a career that spanned 1961 to 1976, he played for Slovan Piešťany, FC Spartak Trnava, FC Dukla Prague and FC Slovan Hlohovec. He appeared in 296 Czechoslovakian league matches and scored 56 goals during his club career.

He made 24 appearances and scored two goals for the Czechoslovakia national football team.

References

External links
Profile at Czech football federation

1944 births
2022 deaths
Slovak footballers
Czechoslovak footballers
Czechoslovakia international footballers
FC Spartak Trnava players
Dukla Prague footballers
Association football midfielders
People from Galanta District
Sportspeople from the Trnava Region